The Men's under-23 time trial of the 2010 UCI Road World Championships cycling event took place on 29 September in Melbourne, Australia.

Taylor Phinney took the United States' first gold medal in the event, since Danny Pate won in Lisbon in 2001, denying Australia's Luke Durbridge by 1.9 seconds, who had been on top for the majority of the event, while Marcel Kittel of Germany took bronze.

Route
The race covered 31.6 km.

Final classification

References

External links

Men's under-23 time trial
UCI Road World Championships – Men's under-23 time trial